Sekolah Menengah Kebangsaan Taman Jelutong (Taman Jelutong National Secondary School, also SMK Taman Jelutong) is a national-level secondary school in Kulim District, Kedah, Malaysia. It is one of the most  highly decorated schools in the area, on par with SMK Sultan Badlishah and SMK Kulim. Students are chosen from those who have achieved 5-6 A's in the UPSR national-level examination for lower form enrolment and 7-9 A's in the PMR national-level examination for upper form enrolment. In 2013, the school catered to 765 students.

In its efforts to establish itself as a premier government religious secondary school, multiple Islamic educational subjects and pious practices have started to be implemented.

The establishment was officially opened as a secular secondary school with plans for stage-by-stage transformation into a religious academic institution. It opened at the same time as its primary school counterpart, SK Taman Jelutong.

Architecture And Floorplan 
With practicality in mind, the school buildings was designed with a simplistic and modern architectural style. It was built to use the limited space to its maximum potential.

The location chosen for the school was a plateau surrounded by, at the time, a recently developing area. The location is surrounded by housing estates, shops, and patches of forestry.

The school is physically separated into three locations; the main complex, the

Staff 
Encik Sunyamin Bin Samsudin

Cik Roshidah

Puan Intan Zarina

Puan Maya

Awards And Official Achievements 
 1st place, Distinguished Hostel For The State Of Kedah Awards 2008, Five Star Hostel.
 3rd place, Distinguished Hostel For The State Of Kedah Awards 2009.
 1st place, Distinguished Hostel For The State Of Kedah Champion Among Champions Awards 2011.
 1st place, School Ranking In Kulim Kedah
1st place in Taekwando competition
3st place in Poetry competition

References 

 Official Website
 District Education Office directory page.

Secondary schools in Malaysia